Thyrocopa viduella is a moth of the family Xyloryctidae. It is endemic to the Hawaiian island of Kauai.

The length of the forewings is 14–17 mm. Adults are on wing at least from June to August. The ground color of the forewings is mottled dark brown and very light whitish brown. The discal area is clouded with poorly defined blackish spots in the cell and a curving poorly defined whitish band through the terminal area and evenly spaced spots on the distal half of the costa and along the termen at the vein endings. The hindwings are very light whitish brown, blending to light brown near the anal margin. The fringe is very light whitish brown.

External links

Thyrocopa
Endemic moths of Hawaii
Moths described in 1907